Events from the year 1742 in Wales.

Incumbents
Lord Lieutenant of North Wales (Lord Lieutenant of Anglesey, Caernarvonshire, Flintshire, Merionethshire, Montgomeryshire) – George Cholmondeley, 3rd Earl of Cholmondeley 
Lord Lieutenant of Glamorgan – Charles Powlett, 3rd Duke of Bolton
Lord Lieutenant of Brecknockshire and Lord Lieutenant of Monmouthshire – Thomas Morgan
Lord Lieutenant of Cardiganshire – John Vaughan, 2nd Viscount Lisburne
Lord Lieutenant of Carmarthenshire – vacant until 1755
Lord Lieutenant of Denbighshire – Sir Robert Salusbury Cotton, 3rd Baronet 
Lord Lieutenant of Pembrokeshire – Sir Arthur Owen, 3rd Baronet
Lord Lieutenant of Radnorshire – James Brydges, 1st Duke of Chandos

Incumbents
Lord Lieutenant of North Wales (Lord Lieutenant of Anglesey, Caernarvonshire, Denbighshire, Flintshire, Merionethshire, Montgomeryshire) – George Cholmondeley, 3rd Earl of Cholmondeley 
Lord Lieutenant of Glamorgan – Charles Powlett, 3rd Duke of Bolton
Lord Lieutenant of Brecknockshire and Lord Lieutenant of Monmouthshire – Thomas Morgan
Lord Lieutenant of Cardiganshire – John Vaughan, 2nd Viscount Lisburne
Lord Lieutenant of Carmarthenshire – vacant until 1755
Lord Lieutenant of Pembrokeshire – Sir Arthur Owen, 3rd Baronet
Lord Lieutenant of Radnorshire – James Brydges, 1st Duke of Chandos

Bishop of Bangor – Thomas Herring 
Bishop of Llandaff – John Gilbert
Bishop of St Asaph – Isaac Maddox
Bishop of St Davids – Nicholas Clagett (until 2 August)

Events
23 February - John Myddelton completes his term as MP for Denbighshire.
July - Sir Watkin Williams-Wynn, 3rd Baronet vacates his Montgomeryshire seat when the result of the previous year's election for Denbighshire is overturned in his favour. 
Howell Harris, Daniel Rowland and their converts form the Methodist Association in Wales.  One of these, William Prichard, is exiled with his family from Glasfryn Fawr and relocates to Plas Penmynydd, Anglesey.
Rebuilding of Trevor Hall, Denbighshire, begins, following the marriage of Mary and John Lloyd (Pentrehobin).

Arts and literature

New books
Richard Farrington - Twenty Sermons
Morgan John Lewis - Sail, Dibenion, a Rheolau'r Societies

Music
John Parry - Antient British Music

Births
9 February - David Davies, clergyman and author (died 1819)
18 February - John Morgan (of Dderw), politician (died 1792)
26 September - Thomas Jones, landscape painter (died 1803)
3 December - Sir Erasmus Gower, naval commander (died 1814)
probable - Watkin Williams, politician (died 1808)

Deaths
January - Hugh Williams (of Chester), politician, 47?
2 March (buried) - Moses Williams, antiquarian scholar, 57
6 March - Arthur Bevan, MP, about 54
June - Jenkin Jones, Arminian clergyman, about 40
8 June - Robert Jones, landowner

References

Wales
Wales